Kaan Yıldırım (born 24 December 1986) is a Turkish actor and producer.

Early life
Yıldırım was born on 24 December 1986 in Istanbul, Turkey. His father, Hakan Yıldırım has medical company.After getting a degree in marketing from Brunel University London, he studied acting at Başkent Communication Sciences Academy.

Career
Yıldırım started his acting career with a supporting role in the crime series Kayıp. His main breakthrough came with his role in popular series Ulan İstanbul, in which he acted alongside his ex-wife Ezgi Eyüboğlu, Uğur Polat, Sevtap Özaltun, Erkan Kolçak Köstendil and Şebnem Bozoklu. In 2015, he played the role of Batu Değirmenci in the series Adı Mutluluk, along with his co-star Ezgi Eyüboğlu. After appearing in a leading role in TRT 1's crime series Halka, he was cast in Hekimoğlu, an adaptation of American series House.

Personal life
On 14 May 2016, he married Ezgi Eyüboğlu in the Esma Sultan Mansion located in Ortaköy. However, the couple divorced on 26 June 2019.

Filmography

References

External links 
 
 

1986 births
Turkish male television actors
Turkish male film actors
Living people